Winthrop Avenue is a major north–south road in the Perth suburbs of Nedlands and Crawley. For most of its length, the road travels alongside the south-western edge of Kings Park, connecting Thomas Street with Stirling Highway, Mounts Bay Road, and the University of Western Australia's Crawley campus. It is the southernmost section of State Route 61, which links Crawley with West Perth and Yokine.

History

Winthrop Avenue is named after Sir John Winthrop Hackett, who was a newspaper editor, politician and university chancellor. Originally named Ferdinand Street after Ferdinand von Mueller, it was renamed in 1932 to perpetuate Hackett's legacy. In 1937 improvements to the road were proposed, to make it attractive, and because the road was "bumpy" and "patched". Though it was a boundary road between the Perth City Council and Subiaco Municipal Council, Subiaco were unwilling to pay for half the cost. Winthrop Avenue remained poorly constructed in 1939, with calls for it to be upgraded to dual carriageway standard. In 1940, a plan for construction of the second carriageway was announced by the King's Park Board, the Perth City Council and the Subiaco Municipal Council. The councils would be jointly responsible for the building of the road, with the King's Park Board responsible for the clearing of vegetation. The resumption of a strip of land along the edge of the park needed for the works was approved by an Act of Parliament.

Route description

Winthrop Avenue's southern terminus is at the intersection of Stirling Highway and Mounts Bay Road. Directly south of the intersection is the Crawley campus of the University of Western Australia, with residential colleges Curie Hall and Saint Catherine's College located north-east and north-west respectively. From this point north, Winthrop Avenue is also part of Tourist Drive 200, a circular route around Kings Park. North of this intersection is the Queen Elizabeth II Medical Centre, where Sir Charles Gairdner Hospital is located. Winthrop Avenue travels alongside the medical centre site for  until its northern terminus at Aberdare Road, at the southern edge of Shenton Park. The road, and State Route 61, continue north-east as Thomas Street, towards West Perth and Subiaco.

Major intersections

Winthrop Avenue's major intersections are controlled by traffic lights.
 Stirling Highway (State Route 5) west / Mounts Bay Road (State Route 5) east / UWA Entrance south
 Monash Avenue west
 Thomas Street (State Route 61 / Tourist Drive 200) north-east / Aberdare Road west

See also

References

Streets in Crawley and Nedlands